Suburban Nature is the second studio album by American singer-songwriter Sarah Jaffe. It was recorded by producer John Congleton of The Paper Chase who is known for recording such artists as Explosions in the Sky, Mount Righteous, Kirk Franklin, and The Polyphonic Spree at Elmwood Studio in Dallas, Texas.

Musicians Kris Youmans and Robert Gomez appeared on the album.

Track listing
 "Before You Go"
 "Stay With Me"
 "Clementine"
 "Better Than Nothing"
 "Vulnerable"
 "Wreaking Havoc"
 "Summer Begs"
 "Pretender Pt. 1"
 "Pretender"
 "Luv"
 "Swelling"
 "Watch Me Fall Apart"
 "Perfect Plan"
 "Nurture It" (iTunes bonus track)

References

External links
 Official website of Sarah Jaffe
 The Track Studio
 Kirtland Records

2010 albums
Sarah Jaffe albums
Albums produced by John Congleton